Riverbank is a city in Stanislaus County, California, United States. The population was 24,623 at the 2020 census, up from 15,826 at the 2000 census. Incorporated on August 23, 1922, Riverbank's official slogan is "City of Action." It is part of the Modesto Metropolitan Statistical Area.

Riverbank was founded as a ferry crossing, and was established as a town with the coming of the San Francisco and San Joaquin Valley Railroad, which was soon acquired by the Santa Fe Railroad. It is named for its location on the Stanislaus River.

History
In the 1850s, the Riverbank area was known as Burneyville. Major James Burney, sheriff of Mariposa, established the Burneyville Ferry over the Stanislaus River at the site of the modern bridge in Riverbank.

Downtown revitalization
Riverbank's downtown was remodeled in 2009. New attractions include a downtown plaza with a mural and statue of a cable ferry operator.

The Riverbank Branch Library on Santa Fe Street is listed on the National Register of Historic Places.

Geography

Demographics

2020
At the 2020 census Riverbank had a population of 24,623. The racial makeup of Riverbank was 16,620 (67.5%) White, 443 (1.8%) African American, 196 (0.8%) Native American, 1,378 (5.6%) Asian, 49 (0.2%) Pacific Islander, 7,805 (31.7%) from other races, and 3,176 (12.9%) from two or more races. Hispanic or Latino of any race were 14,355 persons (58.3%).

There were 6,579 households, 3,380 (51.4%) had children under the age of 18 living in them, 4,053 (61.6%) were opposite-sex married couples living together, 880 (13.4%) had a female householder with no husband present, 434 (6.6%) had a male householder with no wife present. There were 413 (6.3%) unmarried opposite-sex partnerships, and 42 (0.6%) same-sex married couples or partnerships. 923 households (14.0%) were one person and 358 (5.4%) had someone living alone who was 65 or older. The average household size was 3.42. There were 5,367 families (81.6% of households); the average family size was 3.76. (This Information was gathered from the 2010 Census due to lack of information on the official 2020 report)

The age distribution was 1,822 people (7.4%) under the age of 5, 6,943 people (28.2%) under the age of 18, and 2,659 people (10.8%) who were 65 or older. The Female persons percent came up to be 51.6%, or 12,705 people.

The Owner-occupied housing unit rate from 2016-2020 was 66%. The median value of owner-occupied housing units throughout those years $318,800. The median selected monthly owner costs -with a mortgage, 2016-2020 was around $1,711. The median selected monthly owner costs -without a mortgage, 2016-2020 was around $530. Lastly the median gross rent during those 4 years came up to be around $1,244.

2000

At the 2000 census there were 15,826 people in 4,544 households, including 3,821 families, in the city. The racial makeup of the city was 66.85% White, 1.53% African American, 1.43% Native American, 1.31% Asian, 0.13% Pacific Islander, 24.03% from other races, and 4.72% from two or more races. Hispanic or Latino of any race were 45.91%.

Of the 4,544 households 49.6% had children under the age of 18 living with them, 65.0% were married couples living together, 13.2% had a female householder with no husband present, and 15.9% were non-families. 11.9% of households were one person and 4.2% were one person aged 65 or older. The average household size was 3.45 and the average family size was 3.73.

The age distribution was 33.9% under the age of 18, 9.9% from 18 to 24, 30.8% from 25 to 44, 18.2% from 45 to 64, and 7.2% 65 or older. The median age was 30 years. For every 100 females, there were 97.4 males. For every 100 females age 18 and over, there were 95.1 males.

The median income for a household in the city was $44,668, and the median family income  was $47,411. Males had a median income of $36,370 versus $29,012 for females. The per capita income for the city was $14,972. About 9.3% of families and 12.3% of the population were below the poverty line, including 14.8% of those under age 18 and 4.9% of those age 65 or over.

The California State Department of Finance estimates the population of Riverbank as of January 1, 2006 to be 21,215 people, an estimated 34.1% increase since 2000.

Government

Transportation

The BNSF Railway has a mainline running through Riverbank and serves as the BNSF's principal line linking Northern California with the Los Angeles-Chicago mainline. The line used to be owned by the Santa Fe Railway (ATSF).

Amtrak had a station in Riverbank which also served nearby Modesto, California; it was replaced by Modesto station on November 1, 1999, and was destroyed by fire in 2005.

The Stanislaus Regional Transit Authority operates one bus route in Riverside.

Events 
Each year during the second weekend of October, the annual Cheese & Wine Exposition is held. The two-day event features wine and cheese tasting, carnival games, and arts and crafts booths. The Expo draws thousands of people from surrounding towns and agricultural areas.

Public safety
The Stanislaus County Sheriff's Department provides police services to the city.

Schools
Elementary schools
California Avenue Elementary School
Crossroads Elementary School
Mesa Verde Elementary School

Middle schools
Cardozo Middle School

High schools

Enochs High school
Riverbank High School

Other schools
Riverbank Language Academy

Climate 
Winter temperatures range from the mid 40s to the high 60s, summer temperatures from the 50s to the 100s.

Sister cities

Notable people
 Oscar Zeta Acosta - attorney, politician, novelist and Chicano Movement activist.
 German Fernandez - American professional runner.

References

External links
City of Riverbank Web Site
Riverbank Unified School District
Stanislaus Regional Transit

Incorporated cities and towns in California
Cities in Stanislaus County, California
1922 establishments in California
Populated places established in 1922